The Hatching is a 2014 British black comedy horror film directed and co-written by Michael Anderson. It stars Andrew-Lee Potts, Jack McMullen, Laura Aikman, Thomas Turgoose and Justin Lee Collins. The film's plot follows Tim (Potts), a man who returns to his hometown in Somerset, England, to find that the locals are being menaced by killer crocodiles.

The Hatching premiered at the Bath Film Festival in November 2014.

Cast
 Andrew-Lee Potts as Tim
 Thomas Turgoose as Caesar
 Laura Aikman as Lucy
 Jack McMullen as Russell
 Georgia Henshaw as Britney
 Danny Kirrane as Lardy
 Muzz Khan as Baghi
 Justin Lee Collins as Uncle Stan
 Deborah Rosan as Cheryl Coal
 Stevie Alexandria Maxwell as Villager
 Abigail Hamilton as Miss Dunstan

Production
Filming took place in November and December 2013 in West Pennard. Around 60 to 70 Somerset residents volunteered to be background extras, playing such roles as villagers and pub patrons.

During production, a crocodile was reported as being sighted in central Bristol, leading members of the public to contact the film's production team, concerned that one of the crocodiles used during filming may have escaped. The animal trainer for the film, Aria Das Neves, stated that, "While we can confirm we did film with live crocodiles I have contacted the relevant holding zoos and they confirm that all our crocodiles are accounted for."

Release
The Hatching premiered at the Bath Film Festival in Bath, Somerset, on 22 November 2014. A trailer for the film was later released in April 2015.

Home media
The Hatching was released on DVD in 2016.

References

External links
 

2014 comedy horror films
2014 black comedy films
British comedy horror films
British black comedy films
Films about crocodilians
Films set in Somerset
Films shot in Somerset
2010s English-language films
2010s British films